During the 2011–12 season, the English football club Aldershot Town F.C. was placed 11th in the Football League Two. The team reached the 4th round of the Football League Cup.

League table

Squad

Note: Players listed in italics left the club before the end of the season.

Transfers

Squad statistics

Appearances and goals

|}

Note: Does not include appearances and goals for the Aldershot Town vs Southend United match on 26 December 2011 which was abandoned at half-time due to floodlight failure.

Top scorers

Disciplinary record

Results

Pre-season friendlies

League Two

Results summary

Results by round

Results

Note: The Aldershot Town vs Southend United League 2 match was originally held on 26 December 2011, but was abandoned at half-time due to floodlight failure with the score at 0–1. Statistics from the abandoned match not recorded.

FA Cup

Football League Cup 

Note: Aldershot's Carling Cup First Round away trip to West Ham was drawn to be played on 9 August 2011, but Police considered it to be postponed due to the continuing riots happening in London at the time.

Football League Trophy

References 
General
Aldershot Town F.C. Official Website
BBC Sport
Soccerbase

Specific

2011–12
2011–12 Football League Two by team